The following is a list of teams that no longer compete in the National Basketball League (NBL).

Defunct teams

Defunct teams by relations

See also

List of defunct NBL1 teams

References

External links 

NBL teams
Defunct